A Sunny Morning is a 2012 British drama film written and directed by Jacob Proctor and starring Sophia Myles and Charlie Cox. It was released on 12 May 2012.

Cast
Sophia Myles as Grace
Charlie Cox as Adam

Release
A Sunny Morning was released on 12 May 2012 at the Rhode Island International Film Festival, US.

Reception
After moving on through several film festivals on the circuit and winning several awards, the film was praised by reviewers and critics, some of whom named it "an acting masterpiece" and that Cox and Myles "pulled the film together in a positive emotionally touching gem of a movie".

References

External links
 

2012 films
2012 drama films
British drama films
2010s English-language films
2010s British films